is a member of the Supreme Court of Japan.

References

Supreme Court of Japan justices
1939 births
Living people
Kanazawa University alumni